Ivan Oru Simham is a 1982 Indian Malayalam film, directed by N. P. Suresh and produced by Purushan Alappuzha. The film stars Prem Nazir, Srividya, Sukumaran and M. G. Soman in the lead roles. The film has musical score by A. T. Ummer.

Cast
Prem Nazir Babu Suresh
Srividya as Lakshmi
Sukumaran as Gopi
 Prathapachandran
M. G. Soman as Peter
 Cochin Haneefa as Joseph
 Meena
 Balan K. Nair as S K
Reena as Omana
Shanavas as Prabha
Sumithra
 Mala Aravindan
 Janardhanan as Appu
 Kaduvakulam Antony as Pachupilla
Swapna as Swapna

Soundtrack
The music was composed by A. T. Ummer and the lyrics were written by Poovachal Khader.

References

External links
 

1982 films
1980s Malayalam-language films
Films directed by N. P. Suresh